In My Solitude is an album by saxophonist Willis Jackson which was recorded in 1961 and released on the Moodsville label.

Track listing 
 "Nobody Knows the Trouble I've Seen" (Traditional) – 4:13   
 "Sometimes I Feel Like a Motherless Child" (Traditional) – 3:44
 "(In My) Solitude" (Eddie DeLange, Duke Ellington, Irving Mills) – 5:03 
 "Estrellita" (Manuel Ponce) – 4:10
 "It Never Entered My Mind" (Lorenz Hart, Richard Rodgers) – 4:02
 "They Didn't Believe Me" (Jerome Kern, Michael E. Rourke) – 3:38
 "Home" (Harry Clarkson, Geoffrey Clarkson, Peter van Steeden) – 5:10 
 "Nancy (With The Laughing Face)" (Jimmy van Heusen/Phil Silvers) – 5:26
Recorded at Van Gelder Studio in Englewood Cliffs, New Jersey on January 10, 1961 (track 4), and April 11, 1961 (tracks 1-3 & 5-7)

Personnel 
Willis Jackson – tenor saxophone
Jimmy Neeley (track 4), Richard Wyands (tracks 1-3 & 5-8) – piano   
Wendell Marshall (track 4), Peck Morrison (tracks 1-3 & 5-8) – bass
Gus Johnson (track 4), Mickey Roker (tracks 1-3 & 5-8) – drums
Juan Amalbert – congas (track 4)

References 

Willis Jackson (saxophonist) albums
1961 albums
Moodsville Records albums
Albums recorded at Van Gelder Studio
Albums produced by Esmond Edwards